Act of Will is a 1989 mini-series directed by Don Sharp and based on the 1986 novel by Barbara Taylor Bradford. It the third mini-series based on a Bradford novel Sharp had directed and was an early lead role for Elizabeth Hurley.

It was the last directing credit for Sharp.

Plot
The story of three generations of women, from 1926 to the present day.

Cast
Victoria Tennant ...	Audra Crowther
Kevin McNally    ...	Vincent Crowther
Peter Coyote     ...	Miles Sutherland
Elizabeth Hurley ...	Christina Crowther
Lynsey Baxter     ...         Jane Sedgewick
Serena Gordon    ...        Gwen Thornton
Jean Marsh	     ...	Eliza Crowther
Melanie Jessop   ...        Laurette Crowther
Sheila Allen     ...	Lady Dulcie Sedgewick
Richard Bebb     ...	Sir Ralph Sedgewick
Judy Parfitt     ...	Alicia Drummond
Simon Merrick    ...	Percival Drummond
Stuart Milligan  ...	Alex Newman
Gillian Bevan    ...	Millie Arnold
Rebecca Callard  ...	Maggie Crowther
Julian Gartside      ...	Jeffery Freemantle
Andrew Castell   ...	Mike Leslie
Ewan Hooper	     ...	Alfred Crowther
Ken Jones	     ...	Dr. Stalkey
Sheila Ruskin    ...	Candida Sutherland
Fiona Walker     ...	Matron Lennox
Sarah Winman     ...	Kyle Newman
Rachel Robertson ...	Audra Aged 14
Jo Gabb          ...	Christina Aged
Louisa Janes     ...	Christina Aged 10

References

External links

Act of Will at New York Times
Barbara Taylor Bradford's Act of Will at BFI Film and TV Database

1989 British television series debuts
1989 British television series endings
1980s British drama television series
ITV television dramas
1980s British television miniseries
Television shows based on British novels
Films directed by Don Sharp
Television series by ITV Studios
Television shows produced by Tyne Tees Television
English-language television shows
Television shows set in England
Television shows set in France